Cheryomushsky is a rural locality (a settlement) in Cheryomushskoye Rural Settlement of Kotlassky District, Arkhangelsk Oblast, Russia. The population was 1,053 as of 2010. There are 30 streets.

Geography 
Cheryomushsky is located 44 km east of Kotlas (the district's administrative centre) by road. Cheremukha is the nearest rural locality.

References 

Rural localities in Kotlassky District